Uteshev is a family name of Kazakh origin.

Nurlan Uteshev, the leader of the Jas Otan party, Kazakhstan
Yuri Uteshev, a Russian mountaineer